Howland Hill Sargeant (July 13, 1911 – February 29, 1984) was United States Assistant Secretary of State for Public Affairs from 1952–53, and the president of Radio Liberty from 1954 to 1975.

Biography
Born in 1911 in New Bedford, Massachusetts, Howland H. Sargeant was educated at Dartmouth College, graduating in 1932.  He played for the Dartmouth Big Green baseball team.  In 1932, he was a Rhodes scholar.

Sargeant later joined the United States Department of State.  In 1947, he became Deputy Assistant Secretary of State for Public Affairs.  In this capacity, he was a member of the United States delegation to UNESCO and in 1950 was Vice-President of the UNESCO General Conference that met in Florence.

During his time as Deputy Assistant Secretary of State for Public Affairs, Sargeant met actress Myrna Loy, who was a member of the U.S. delegation to UNESCO. Sargeant married Loy on June 2, 1951, becoming Loy's fourth husband.  This marriage would end in a divorce on May 31, 1960, and the couple did not have any children.

In 1952, President of the United States Harry Truman nominated Sargeant to be Assistant Secretary of State for Public Affairs and Sargeant subsequently held this office from February 21, 1952, until January 29, 1953.

The American Committee for the Liberation of the Peoples of Russia founded Radio Liberty in 1954, and Sargeant became Radio Liberty's first president.  He held this position until 1975. Radio Liberty merged with Radio Free Europe in 1976.

He died on February 29, 1984, of an apparent heart attack.

References

United States Assistant Secretaries of State
Dartmouth College alumni
Dartmouth Big Green baseball players
American Rhodes Scholars
1911 births
1984 deaths